The Black Ace is a 1928 American silent Western film directed by Leo D. Maloney and starring Don Coleman, Jeanette Loff and J.P. McGowan.

Cast
 Don Coleman as Dan Stockton 
 Jeanette Loff
 Billy Butts 
 J.P. McGowan
 Noble Johnson
 William Steele
 Ben Corbett
 Ed Jones

References

External links
 

1928 films
1928 Western (genre) films
Films directed by Leo D. Maloney
American black-and-white films
Pathé Exchange films
Silent American Western (genre) films
1920s English-language films
1920s American films